The Altoona Herald-Mitchellville Index is the weekly newspaper of Altoona, Iowa and the surrounding area.

Newspapers published in Iowa
1890 establishments in Iowa